Sport Week was a weekly sports newspaper based in Patras in the Achaea prefecture in Greece.  It was first published in 1999 from S Media Group S.A..  It had many pages and these pages features news from all the athletic information from Achaea, Etoloakarnania, Ilia, Kefalonia and Zakynthos.

See also
List of newspapers in Greece

References
The first version of the article is translated and is based from the article at the Greek Wikipedia (el:Main Page)

Greek-language newspapers
Newspapers published in Patras
Publications established in 1999
Sports mass media in Greece
Sports newspapers
Weekly newspapers published in Greece
RCS MediaGroup newspapers
1999 establishments in Greece